Dead End Drive-In is a 1986 Australian dystopian action film about a teenage couple trapped in a drive-in theatre which is really a concentration camp for societal rejects. The inmates, many of whom sport punk fashion, are placated with a steady diet of junk food, new wave music, drugs, and exploitation films. The film was directed by Brian Trenchard-Smith and stars Ned Manning and Natalie McCurry as the captive couple, and Peter Whitford as the manager of the drive-in. Mad Max 2 stuntman Guy Norris did some of the stunts. The soundtrack includes contemporary popular music performed by such bands as Kids in the Kitchen and Hunters and Collectors. The song during the rolling credits is "Playing With Fire" by Lisa Edwards.

Plot 
In the near future, the economy has collapsed and massive crime waves sweep the inner cities.  The manufacturing industry has shrunk to the point where cars are a commodity and parts are fought over between salvage companies and roving gangs.  In an attempt to control these crime-waves, a chain of drive-in theatres is turned into concentration camps for the undesirables and unemployed youth. The dirty, graffiti-laden drive-ins are surrounded by high fences, and the roads leading to them (called Security Roads or "S-Roads") are not allowed to be walked on under any circumstance. Police collaborate with the drive-in owners to sabotage cars of unsuspecting visitors; however, some who know the true nature of the drive-ins come voluntarily for the shelter and food.  Broken cars are continually collected at these facilities.  The prisoners are allowed easy access to a wide variety of drugs, alcohol, junk food, exploitation films, and new wave music.  This, coupled with the awful conditions on the outside, engineer an atmosphere of complacency and hopelessness so that the inmates will accept their fate and not attempt escape.

Jimmy "Crabs" Rossini, a young fitness enthusiast, sneaks off in his brother's vintage 1956 Chevy to take his girlfriend, Carmen, to the local Star Drive-In.  He tells the owner they are unemployed to get a discounted rate.  While Crabs is intimate with Carmen, the rear wheels of his car are stolen, and Crabs soon discovers the police are responsible.  Crabs complains to the owner, but he refuses to help until morning.  The next morning, Crabs and Carmen are amazed at the number of cars still there, many of which have been turned into hovels.  The owner, Thompson, pretends to fill out a report and enters them both into the system.  He lets them know they will be there for a while, as there are no buses or cabs, and gives them a stack of meal tickets to use at the run-down café.  Time drags on, and Crabs makes several attempts at escape that are all thwarted.

Preparing for an attempt to climb a fence, Crabs soon discovers that it is electrified. He locates the wheels he needs but learns his fuel tank has been drained.  He steals fuel from a police vehicle, but then finds his engine stripped.  Suspecting that Thompson, who receives a stipend for each prisoner, is behind the sabotage, Crabs warns him not to interfere again. Further complicating matters are the verbal and physical fights Crabs continues to have with one of the racist gangs.  During this time, Carmen makes no attempt to avoid the unhealthy eating and drug culture at the camp.  She becomes friends with several of the female inmates, who are successful at indoctrinating her to the encampment's bizarre racist mentality that non-white Australians are somehow to blame for society's problems; a situation exacerbated by the arrival of foreigners trucked into the camp.  All attempts to talk sense into her fail, and Crabs soon realizes that she has succumbed to the hopelessness that pervades the encampment, as have many of the other trapped kids that Jimmy tries to talk sense into.

Crabs makes one more spectacular effort at escape: while the majority of the encampment, including Carmen, attend a racist meeting, he hijacks a tow truck.  He attempts to sneak out peacefully, but is recognized by Thompson.  This leads to a car chase inside the encampment; the police fire automatic weapons at the tow truck, which frightens the prisoners who are hiding in the café.  Eventually, Crabs crashes but manages to elude the police on foot.  He finds Carmen and unsuccessfully attempts to reason with her; he kisses her and wishes her well.  Crabs disarms Thompson and forces him to delete his profile, but his escape attempt ends in a violent confrontation with the police; Thompson is accidentally killed, and the remaining policeman hunts down Crabs.  Using the lowered ramp of a police tow truck that is parked near the main entrance, Crabs launches a stolen police tow truck over the fence and lands on the S-Road, successfully driving away to freedom.

Cast 

 Ned Manning as Jimmy "Crabs" Rossini
 Natalie McCurry as Carmen
 Peter Whitford as Thompson
 Wilbur Wilde as Hazza
 Dave Gibson as Dave
 Sandie Lillingston as Beth
 Ollie Hall as Frank Rossini
 Lyn Collingwood as Fay
 Nikki McWaters as Shirl
 Melissa Davis as Narelle
 Margi di Ferranti as Jill
 Desirée Smith as Tracey
 Murray Fahey as Mickey
 Jeremy Shadlow as Jeff
 Brett Climo as Don
 Alan McQueen as Accident Cop
 Ken Snodgrass as Accident Cop
 Bill Lyle as Drive-In Cop
 Garry Who as Drive-In Cop
 Bernadette Foster as Momma Rossini
 Ron Sinclair as Roger McManus
 Gandhi MacIntyre as Indian
 David Jones as TV Newsreader

Production 
The movie was based on a short story by Peter Carey although Brian Trenchard-Smith says he had not read it when he came on board the project. A previous director had been attached but had pulled out. "I came in, took a week, and welded the best elements from the first three drafts together, boosting the social comment," says Trenchard-Smith.

The film was shot over 35 days at a drive-in theatre in Matraville starting on 9 September 1985. Funding came from the New South Wales Film Corporation. The director said of the film that:
The Drive-In is, of course, an allegory for the junk values of the eighties, which our hero sees as a prison. The last 20 minutes of the film - the escape - is the desperate blazing climax, but the whole film has a feeling of high style, of heightened or enhanced reality - a little bit over the top, but retaining a reality that the public will accept.
The final stunt by Guy Norris cost around $75,000, more than any previous single stunt in Australia, and set a world record for a jump by a truck: .

Release 
Dead End Drive-In grossed $68,000 at the box office in Australia. It was released on DVD in the US by Image Entertainment on 20 September 2011, and in the UK by Arrow Video in April 2013.

Reception 
Michael Wilmington of the Los Angeles Times called it an "exciting and offbeat" clone of Mad Max 2 that is "worth looking for." Ian Berriman of SFX rated it 3.5/5 stars and wrote that the film's premise is unconvincing, but the production design is impressive. Chris Holt of Starburst rated it 6/10 and cited the atmosphere and style as saving graces in a film where "not all that much happens" and the performances are poor. Bill Gibron of DVD Verdict wrote that the film's themes are "cliché and lame" and the film tries too hard without going far enough. Luke Buckmaster of Senses of Cinema called it Trenchard-Smith's "magnum opus" and "a perfectly gloomy fusion of physical objects juxtaposed with the story’s otherworldly elements and creepy dystopian undercurrents."

Quentin Tarantino has cited Dead End Drive-In as his favorite film from Trenchard-Smith.

Accolades
Production designer Lawrence Eastwood was nominated for Best Production Design at the 1986 AFI Awards.

Legacy 
Dead End Drive-In was included in Not Quite Hollywood: The Wild, Untold Story of Ozploitation!, a documentary about Ozploitation films.

Canadian punk band from Vancouver, Dead End Drive-In, takes their name from this film.

See also 
 Cinema of Australia

References

Further reading

External links 
 
Dead End Drive-In at Australian Screen Online

1986 films
1986 independent films
1980s science fiction action films
1980s dystopian films
Australian independent films
Australian science fiction action films
Dystopian films
Punk films
Australian post-apocalyptic films
Films based on science fiction short stories
Films set in 1995
Films set in the future
Films set in a movie theatre
Films set in Australia
Films shot in Sydney
Films directed by Brian Trenchard-Smith
1980s English-language films